Millersburg is a home rule-class city in Bourbon County, Kentucky, United States. The population was 792 at the 2010 census. It is part of the Lexington–Fayette Metropolitan Statistical Area.

History
Millersburg was founded in 1817. It was named for John Miller. Probably from its founding and certainly from the appointment on 4 December 1833 of Charles Talbutt as postmaster, the post office was referred to as Millersburgh. (A K Vinney and A L Miller assumed the postmaster duties on 1 January 1836, then Oscar J Miller became postmaster on 15 May 1837). Some postmasters were appointed to "Millersburgh" and others to "Millersburg". The post office name officially changed from Millersburgh to Millersburg on 15 May 1889, exactly one month into the tenure of postmaster Ida B. Collier, and has since been known solely as Millersburg. John A Miller Sr. preceded Miss Collier as postmaster.

Geography

Demographics

As of the 2000 census, there were 842 people, 356 households, and 248 families residing in the city. The racial makeup of the city was 94.66% White, 3.44% African American, 0.83% Native American, 0.59% from other races, and 0.48% from two or more races. Hispanic or Latino of any race were 1.19% of the population.

There were 356 households, out of which 29.5% had children under the age of 18 living with them, 50.8% were married couples living together, 14.6% had a female householder with no husband present, and 30.3% were non-families. 26.7% of all households were made up of individuals, and 11.8% had someone living alone who was 65 years of age or older. The average household size was 2.37 and the average family size was 2.84.

In the city, the population was spread out, with 24.0% under the age of 18, 8.4% from 18 to 24, 27.0% from 25 to 44, 24.9% from 45 to 64, and 15.7% who were 65 years of age or older. The median age was 38 years. For every 100 females, there were 91.8 males. For every 100 females age 18 and over, there were 92.8 males.

The median income for a household in the city was $25,500, and the median income for a family was $32,692. Males had a median income of $29,861 versus $18,333 for females. The per capita income for the city was $13,906. About 12.4% of families and 15.7% of the population were below the poverty line, including 23.0% of those under the age of 18 and 11.6% of those age 65 or over.

Notable people

 Blanton Collier, American football coach born in Millersburg
 Jim Kelly, martial artist of the 1970s, born in Millersburg. He co-starred with Bruce Lee in the film Enter the Dragon.
 Mae Street Kidd (1909–1999), State Representative 1968–1984, representing Louisville's 41st state legislative district; born in Millersburg
 David McDonald, judge, born in Millersburg
 Alma Bridwell White, founder of the Pillar of Fire Church and Ku Klux Klan advocate

Military academies
Millersburg is the site of the headquarters of the American Military Cadet Corps, the National Cadet Training Center, HHC American Cadet Alliance and the campus of the historic Millersburg Military Institute (MMI) opened in 1893.

The American Cadet Alliance, part of the American Military Cadet Corps  the largest entity within Millersburg  provides two to six weeks of career exploration programs during the summer. All cadets must be crime-free, drug-free, and doing well in school. Since 1909, ACA has trained and hosted thousands of young people from throughout the United States and from 21 foreign countries. Graduation ceremonies are held throughout the summer. Each ceremony is open to the public.

The former Forest Hill Military Academy, a preparatory school for young men and women in 6th through 12th grades, opened in August 2012. As of December 5, 2014, the Academy announced that the school would be closed for the 2015 Spring Semester in order to reorganize its structure and finances. It will still be open for students in the CADET-13 Program and the summer camp, and events will still occur. The school will open back up for the Fall 2015 semester changing its name back to the Millersburg Military Institute, while the US Army Cadet Corps is reforming as the "American Military Cadet Corps".

In 2016 Community Ventures Corporation purchased the property and began an extensive renovation of the historic gymnasium and Allen House mansion. The mission of Community Ventures at Mustard Seed Hill, formerly MMI,  is to facilitate redevelopment of Millersburg by drawing thousands of guests and reviving local businesses.

In 2017 the gymnasium opened and hosts numerous basketball and volleyball tournaments, in addition to community activities. Bourbon Christian Academy also operates as school in the gymnasium complex.

The Allen House has become a wedding destination, corporate retreat location and prime venue for the surrounding counties. Of note is the Christmas light display that draws thousands of visitors to the 30' ribbon tree, walk-through Christmas Ornament and life-sized sled.

See also
 List of cities in Kentucky

References

External links

 

Cities in Bourbon County, Kentucky
Cities in Kentucky
Lexington–Fayette metropolitan area
1817 establishments in Kentucky